Daniel Barbus (born 10 February 1996) is a Polish footballer who plays as a midfielder for TS Gwarek Tarnowskie Góry.

References

External links

1996 births
Living people
Polish footballers
Association football midfielders
Ekstraklasa players
Górnik Zabrze players
Puszcza Niepołomice players
Polonia Bytom players
Place of birth missing (living people)